Idalgashinna is a small village in the Badulla District, Uva Province, Sri Lanka. The area is home to the Idalgashinna Estate, with the closest large town being Haputale, about 9km south on the railway. Between the two locales lies the Thangamale Bird Sanctuary. Education in the area comes under the purview of the Welimada Divisional Secretariat, which administers the Idalgashinna Tamil Vidyalaya (Idalgashinna Tamil College), Beauvais Tamil Vidyalaya and the Ellethota Vidyalaya.

Idalgashinna was established as a tea estate in 1984, although the area had seen isolated periods of settlement prior to this. The Idalgashinna Pass is a prominent geological feature in the area; Idalgashinna was regarded as a key entrance to the upland country, with the Portuguese attempting to use the pass in their wars against the Kingdom of Kandy in the 16th century.

Railway station

References

Towns in Badulla District